The IVECO Bus Crossway is an urban and intercity bus produced by IVECO Bus since 2006.

Features 
Body is semi-self-supporting with frame and engine with manual gearbox and automatic gearbox placed to the rear ('pusher bus'). Only rear axle is powered. All axles use air suspension. On the right side are two or three doors. Interior seating is cloth. The drivers cab is integral with the rest of the vehicle.

Production and operation 

In 2006, the Crossway was put into serial production. In 2013 a modernised version was introduced, with a Euro VI engine and a refreshed appearance.

Irisbus Crossway (2006–2013)
Launched in 2006 and continued production until 2013, it was the first vehicle to comply with the Euro IV Emission Standards, the ABS and ASR are standard equipment.

The Irisbus Crossway was offered in four lengths:
Crossway 10.8 m
 Manufactured since 2007 until 2013 as the replacement for Arway 10.6 m.
Crossway 12 m
 Manufactured from 2007 to 2013 together with Crossway 10.8 m. It replaces the Arway 12.8 m and Axer 12.8 m.
Crossway 12.8 m
 Manufactured from 2007 until 2013 replacing the Arway 12.8 m and Axer 12.8 m, in 2013, the Crossway 12.8 m was replaced with the 13 m variant.
Crossway 13 m
 Manufactured since 2013 as the replacement for Crossway 12.8 m.

IVECO Crossway (2013–)
The New Iveco Crossway was launched in 2013 with five variants:

Crossway Pop
 Production: 2013-Present
 Dimensions: 10.8 m, 12 m, 12.8 m, 13 m (until 2013).
 Engines: IVECO Tector 6 or IVECO Tector 7 mated to 6-speed manual or 4 or 6-speed automatic gearbox.

Crossway Line
 Production: 2013-Presemt
 Dimensions: 10.8 m, 12 m, 12.8 m, 13 m (until 2013).
 Engines: IVECO Tector 6/7 or IVECO Cursor 8/9, mated to a 6-speed manual or 4/6 speed automatic transmissions.

Crossway HV
Stands for High Value. Equipped with integrated air conditioning, Vetilator and Individual Lighting systems, powered by the Cursor Engine mated to an Automatic gearbox.

Crossway Pro
Intended for Regional Transport. 
 Production: 2007-Present
 Dimensions: 10.8 m, 12 m, 12.8 m, 13 m (until 2013).
 Engines: IVECO Cursor 8 or 9 mated to a 4 or 6-speed automatic gearbox.

Crossway LE
The low floor version of the Crossway is launched in 2007 with two variants:
 City: Available for Urban and Suburban trips.
 Line: Available for Suburban and Intercity trips.

Engine and Powertrain
IVECO Tector 6 - 5.9 litre Turbocharged and Intercooled Inline-six cylinder engine with Euro IV and V emission compliant.
IVECO Tector 7 -  6.7 litre Turbocharged and Intercooled Inline-six cylinder engine with Euro V and VI emission compliant.
IVECO Cursor 8 - 7.9 litre Turbocharged and Intercooled Inline-six cylinder engine with Euro IV, V and EEV Emission Compliant.
IVECO Cursor 9 - 8.7 litre Turbocharged and Intercooled Inline-six cylinder engine with Euro V and VI emission compliant.

Operators
 Austria: ÖBB Postbus, 'over 200' buses
 Czech Republic: Operate for Exprescar Kladno on route 399 between Kladno and Prague.
 Denmark: Midttrafik, Sydtrafik, Movia, Tide Bus, Arriva Aalborg operating 118 high-floor  and 24 low-floor (Crossway LE) models
 Estonia: Operating total 88 high-floor and 43 low-floor (Crossway LE)
 Finland: Transdev Finland, (Transdev 's operations in finland ended in 2019.)
 France: Aix-les-Bains (operated by Ondea) Côtes-d'Armor (operated by Ti'bus).
 Germany: OIE AG (Idar-Oberstein)
 Iceland: Operate services in Reykjavík for Straeto bs.
 Italy: TPER (Bologna), SACA Bus, CO. ER. BUS, SAB (Bergamo), SAD (South Tyrol), AIR (Avellino), Air Pullman Malpensa, Ferrovie Nord Milano Autoservizi and Azienda Trasporti Milanesi (Milan), CTT Nord, Tiemme Toscana Mobilità and Autolinee Toscane (Tuscany), GTT, Sadem (Turin), Trasporto Unico Abruzzese (Abruzzo), Cotral (Lazio), SAI (Treviglio), ATP Esercizio (Liguria), ARST (Sardinia), Azienda per la Mobilità Integrata (Pesaro), STAV (Vigevano), TPL Linea (Savona), TPL FVG (Udine), CLP (Caserta)
 Netherlands: Amstelveen. Connexxion, operating 68 Iveco Crossway Low Entry
 Portugal: TST - Transportes Sul do Tejo SA, operates Crossway City LE and Crossway Line models.
 Spain: Intercitybus (Lanzarote) 
 Sweden: Jönköpings Länstrafik operates 2 Crossways owned by Aneby Buss AB

See also
 List of buses

References

External links

 

Buses
Crossway
Buses of the Czech Republic
Vehicles introduced in 2006